Cheng Shewo (28 August 1898 - 1 January 1991) was a journalist, publisher, and educator of the Republic of China. He was the founder of Shih Hsin University in Taiwan.

Biography
Cheng was born in Nanjing in 1898, with his ancestral home in Xiangxiang, Hunan. His father, Cheng Bi, was an officer.

In 1912, Cheng went out into the world when he was 14 years old. At age 17, Cheng worked as an editor in Jianbao. In 1913, Cheng started to publish articles. In 1915, Cheng went to Shanghai to found the Maiwen Company. In 1917, Cheng moved to Beijing, he graduated from Peking University in 1921, where he majored in Chinese Literature. After graduation, Cheng founded World Evening News, World Daily, and World Illustrated. In 1927, Cheng returned to Nanjing to found Min Sheng Bao.

From 1930 to 1931, Cheng visited France, Switzerland, Belgium, Germany, and the United Kingdom. In this trip Cheng observed modern European societies and cultures for the first time.

In 1933, Cheng founded Beijing News College. In 1935, Cheng founded Lihpao Daily.

When the People's Liberation Army occupied Beijing, Cheng escaped to Hong Kong. Cheng settled in Taiwan in 1952.

In the late 1950s, Cheng Shewo and Yeh Ming-hsun co-founded the Shih Hsin School of Journalism (now Shih Hsin University) in Taiwan.

In 1991, Cheng died of illness in Taipei.

Personal life
Cheng was married three times. He had two children (two daughters) with Yang Fan, three children with Xiao Zongrang and no children with Han Jingliang.

With Yang Fan: 
 Cheng Youshu (born 1924), a Chinese diplomat and poet.
 Cheng Zhifan (born 1928), a Chinese-French musician

With Xiao Zongrang:
 Cheng Siwei (1935–2015), a Chinese politician
 , (born 1937), a Taiwanese educator
 Lucie Cheng, (1939–2010) a professor in Shih Hsin University

References

1898 births
People from Xiangxiang
Writers from Nanjing
National University of Peking alumni
1991 deaths
Educators from Nanjing
Chinese newspaper editors
Academic staff of Shih Hsin University
Taiwanese people from Jiangsu
Members of the 1st Legislative Yuan
Members of the 1st Legislative Yuan in Taiwan
Republic of China politicians from Beijing
School founders
Founders of universities
Chinese Civil War refugees
20th-century newspaper founders
20th-century Taiwanese educators